Royal Air Force Bottesford or more simply RAF Bottesford is a former Royal Air Force station located on the Leicestershire-Lincolnshire county border,  north west of Grantham, Lincolnshire and  south of Newark-on-Trent, Nottinghamshire and about  north-northwest of London, England.

Opened in 1942, it was used by both the Royal Air Force (RAF) and United States Army Air Forces (USAAF). During World War II it was used primarily as a troop carrier airfield for paratroopers and as a bomber airfield before closing in 1948.

Today the remains of the airfield are located on private property with the technical site being used as an industrial estate.One of the runways is currently used by Cazoo for storing cars and the control tower used as an office.

History

RAF Bomber Command use
The airfield was opened as a RAF Bomber Command station in No. 5 Group RAF area during the autumn of 1941, with No. 207 Squadron RAF moving in with its troublesome Avro Manchesters during November. However, because of continual difficulties experienced with their Rolls-Royce Vulture engines operations were frequently curtailed, but in March 1942 the squadron was able to step up its bombing raids on Germany when it became one of the first to receive the new Avro Lancaster in March 1942.

No. 207 Sqn left in September 1942 for RAF Langar and in November a new Australian manned squadron, No. 467 Squadron RAAF, arrived in November 1942 commencing operations on the night of 2/3 January 1943.

USAAF use
It was first occupied by the 50th Troop Carrier Wing Headquarters on 15 November. It was then opened as a reception base for Douglas C-47/C-53 Skytrain groups that were scheduled to fly in from the United States.

It was known as USAAF Station AAF-481 for security reasons by the USAAF during the war, and by which it was referred to instead of location.  Its USAAF Station Code was "AQ".

436th Troop Carrier Group
The first USAAF group to arrive at Bottesford was 436th Troop Carrier Group a few days into the New Year from Baer Army Airfield, Indiana. Operational squadrons of the group were:
 79th Troop Carrier Squadron (S6)
 80th Troop Carrier Squadron (7D)
 81st Troop Carrier Squadron (U5)
 82nd Troop Carrier Squadron (3D)

The 436th TCG was assigned to the 53rd Troop Carrier Wing.  On 3 March the 436th Group was moved south to lake up station at RAF Membury

440th Troop Carrier Group
Within a week (between 8/11 March), the C-47s of the 440th Troop Carrier Group started to arrive from Baer Army Airfield. Operational squadrons of the group were:
 95th Troop Carrier Squadron (9X)
 96th Troop Carrier Squadron (6Z)
 97th Troop Carrier Squadron (W6)
 98th Troop Carrier Squadron (8Y)
 
After using the airfield during the following two months for glider repair and modification, the USAAF then departed.

Subsequent RAF wartime use
The USAAF relinquished Bottesford to No. 5 Group Bomber Command in July 1944.  After the end of the war, a small holding party remained for a few years until it was sold off in 1948.

The following units were also here at some point:

Current use
With the facility released from military control, farmers were using the land for crops.  Today, the technical site buildings are operated as an industrial facility.  Runways, all of which still exist with just a small amount of concrete (mostly dispersal loops) being removed for hardcore.

The perimeter track and two T-2 hangars still exist, being used for unknown purposes, although the condition of the perimeter track is very deteriorated.  The former airfield control tower has been restored and used as offices.

See also

List of former Royal Air Force stations

References

Citations

Bibliography

 Freeman, Roger A. (1994) UK Airfields of the Ninth: Then and Now 1994. After the Battle

External links

 RAF Bottesford
 RAF Bottesford at controltowers.co.uk
 Recent photos of RAF Bottesford

Airfields of the IX Troop Carrier Command in the United Kingdom
Royal Air Force stations in Leicestershire
Royal Air Force stations of World War II in the United Kingdom